Bormist is a rural locality (a village) in Chaykovsky, Perm Krai, Russia. The population was 119 as of 2010.

Geography 
Bormist is located 52 km east of Chaykovsky. Alnyash is the nearest rural locality.

References 

Rural localities in Chaykovsky urban okrug